"Lost and Found" is a song written by Kix Brooks and Don Cook and recorded by American country music duo Brooks & Dunn. It was released in September 1992 as the fifth and final single from their debut album, Brand New Man. It peaked at number 6 on the Billboard Hot Country Singles & Tracks chart. Additionally, it was the first single to feature Kix Brooks on lead vocals instead of Ronnie Dunn, and the first single of their career to miss the No. 1 spot.

American Aquarium covered the song on their 2021 album Slappers, Bangers, and Certified Twangers: Vol 1.

Music video
The music video was directed by Michael Merriman and premiered in November 1992. The video was filmed in Tijuana, Mexico.

Chart positions
"Lost and Found" debuted on the U.S. Billboard Hot Country Singles & Tracks for the week of September 19, 1992.

References

1992 singles
Brooks & Dunn songs
Songs written by Kix Brooks
Songs written by Don Cook
Song recordings produced by Scott Hendricks
Song recordings produced by Don Cook
Arista Nashville singles
1991 songs